Dejan Bojović (born 3 April 1983) is former Serbian volleyball player, a member of Serbia men's national volleyball team, a participant of the 2008 Olympic Games, medalist of European Championship and World League.

Achievements
  2002/2003 Serbian Championship winner
  2005/2006 Serbian Cup winner
  2008/2009 Emperors Cup winner
  2008/2009 Japanese Championship winner, V-league MVP, Best 6 award
  2008/2009 Best 6 award – Kurowashi Cup
  2009/2010 Best scorer award – V-league
  2010/2011 Kurowashi Cup winner, Best 6 award
  2011/2012 Best 6 award – V-league
  2013/2014 Emperors Cup winner
  2014/2015 Best 6 award – Kurowashi Cup

External links
 
 interview with Dejan Bojović

Living people
1983 births
People from Smederevska Palanka
Serbian men's volleyball players
Olympic volleyball players of Serbia
Volleyball players at the 2008 Summer Olympics
Olympiacos S.C. players
Serbia and Montenegro men's volleyball players
Serbian expatriate sportspeople in Greece
Serbian expatriate sportspeople in Italy
Serbian expatriate sportspeople in Japan